Aughenbaugh Peak is a sharp peak in Antarctica, rising to over . It was mapped by the United States Geological Survey from surveys and from U.S. Navy air photos, 1956–66, and named by the Advisory Committee on Antarctic Names for Nolan B. Aughenbaugh, a glaciologist at Ellsworth Station and a member of the first party to visit Dufek Massif in December 1957.

References
 

Mountains of Queen Elizabeth Land
Pensacola Mountains